The Eurasia Continental Bridge corridor is a high-speed rail corridor connecting Lianyungang, a port in northern Jiangsu province, to Ürümqi, the regional capital of Xinjiang. The corridor passes through the cities of Xuzhou (Jiangsu), Zhengzhou (Henan), Xi'an (Shaanxi), Lanzhou (Gansu), and Xining (Qinghai) en route. Announced in 2016 as part of the "eight verticals and eight horizontals" railway network plan, the rail corridor is an extension of the existing Xuzhou–Lanzhou high-speed railway.

The railway may be considered to be part of the New Eurasian Land Bridge.

Sections

References

See also 
 High-speed rail in China

High-speed rail in China